Frederick James Erroll, 1st Baron Erroll of Hale, Baron Erroll of Kilmun,  (27 May 1914 – 14 September 2000) was a British Conservative politician.

Background and education
Erroll was the son of George Murison Bergmans, an engineer, and Kathleen, daughter of George Brodrick Edington, a Glasgow ironmaster. The family changed their German surname to Erroll during the First World War. He was educated at Oundle School and at Trinity College, Cambridge, graduating with a bachelor's degree  in mechanical sciences.

Early life and Second World War
Erroll was an engineer at Metropolitan-Vickers Electrical Co. Ltd, Manchester, 1936–38. He was commissioned into 4th County of London Yeomanry (Sharpshooters), Territorial Army in 1939, and held technical appointments in connection with tank construction and testing (advising SEAC, 1940–43) and served in India and Burma, 1944–45. He left the forces in 1945 with the rank of colonel.

Political career
Erroll was elected as Member of Parliament for Altrincham and Sale in 1945, holding the seat until 1964.  He was Parliamentary Secretary to the Ministry of Supply, 1955–56; Parliamentary Secretary to the Board of Trade, 1956–58; Economic Secretary to the Treasury, 1958–59; Minister of State for Trade, 1959–61; President of the Board of Trade, 1961–63; and Minister of Power, 1963–64. In 1964 he was raised to the peerage as Baron Erroll of Hale, of Kilmun in the County of Argyll. In 1972 he was President of the Electric Vehicle Association of Great Britain. In 1999, aged 85, he was awarded a life peerage as Baron Erroll of Kilmun, of Kilmun in Argyll and Bute, to allow him to sit in the House of Lords following the passing of the House of Lords Act 1999, which excluded hereditary peers.

He was a Member of the House of Lords Select committee on Science and Technology, 1985–91. He held a large number of business appointments.

Personal life
He married Elizabeth Barrow in 1950. Lord Erroll of Hale died in Kensington and Chelsea aged 86. As they had no children, the hereditary barony became extinct on his death.

References

External links 
 

|-

1914 births
2000 deaths
3rd County of London Yeomanry (Sharpshooters) officers
Alumni of Trinity College, Cambridge
British Army personnel of World War II
Conservative Party (UK) MPs for English constituencies
Erroll of Kilmun
Engineers from London
Members of the Privy Council of the United Kingdom
Ministers in the Eden government, 1955–1957
Ministers in the Macmillan and Douglas-Home governments, 1957–1964
Parliamentary Secretaries to the Board of Trade
People educated at Oundle School
Presidents of the Board of Trade
UK MPs 1945–1950
UK MPs 1950–1951
UK MPs 1951–1955
UK MPs 1955–1959
UK MPs 1959–1964
UK MPs 1964–1966
UK MPs who were granted peerages
Hereditary barons created by Elizabeth II
Life peers created by Elizabeth II
Erroll of Hale